is a railway station on the JR Hokkaido Sekishō Line. It is located in Shimukappu, Hokkaidō, Japan.

History 
 1 October 1981: Opened as 
 1 February 1987: Renamed to Tomamu Station

Station structure
The above-ground station has two platforms serving two tracks.
 Platforms

 The station is unstaffed.
 There is a JR reservation office in the hotel near the station.

Adjacent stations 
Hokkaido Railway Company
Sekishō Line
 Shimukappu Station - (Higashi-Shimukappu Signal Ground) - (Takinosawa Signal Ground) - (Horoka Signal Ground) - Tomamu Station　- (Kushinai Signal Ground) - (Kami-Ochiai Signal Ground) - (Shin-Karikachi Signal Ground) - (Hirouchi Signal Ground) - (Nishi-Shintoku Signal Ground) - Shintoku Station

Railway stations in Japan opened in 1981
Tomamu Station